Zheng Dazhen (born September 22, 1959) is a retired Chinese high jumper.

She finished eleventh at the 1984 Summer Olympics, and also won the 1984 Friendship Games. In 1983 she reached the final of the inaugural World Championships in Athletics, but finished 18th and last with only 1.80 metres. 

On the regional level she won the Asian Championships in 1979 and 1983 as well as the 1978 and 1982 Asian Games, both times in new championship records (CR). In 1978 she jumped 1.88 m to improve the record with 10 centimetres; in 1982 she jumped 1.89 m. At the 1986 Asian Games Zheng got the silver medal despite equalling the CR, as the winner Megumi Sato, too equalling the CR, achieved the result with fewer failed attempts. In 1990 Sato set the current Asian Games record with 1.94 m.

Her personal best jump was 1.95 metres, achieved in May 1987 in Fukuoka.

External links
 

1959 births
Living people
Athletes (track and field) at the 1984 Summer Olympics
Chinese female high jumpers
Olympic athletes of China
Asian Games medalists in athletics (track and field)
Athletes (track and field) at the 1978 Asian Games
Athletes (track and field) at the 1982 Asian Games
Athletes (track and field) at the 1986 Asian Games
Asian Games gold medalists for China
Asian Games silver medalists for China
Medalists at the 1978 Asian Games
Medalists at the 1982 Asian Games
Medalists at the 1986 Asian Games